Sporting Clube de Timor is an East Timorese football club based in Dili. It was founded in 1938 by 25 members led by Jaime Montalvão de Carvalho, first president of the club, José António Montalvão dos Santos e Silva, and Jacinto Montalvão dos Santos e Silva.  They currently dispute the Liga Futebol Amadora Segunda Divisão. And it also participates in other competitions organized by East Timor Football Federation such as Copa FFTL and Taça 12 de Novembro. They one of the oldest football club in Timor Leste.

Squad (2020)

Starting Players

1. Cesar de Jesus(GK)
21. Canisio Santos
4. Américo Martins
12. Lesi Atok
6. Lexy Atok
16. Florindo Soares
5. Zito Moreira
7. Leandro Amaral
8. Lesy Atok
9. Michael Luz
10. Bonifácio Cabral

Head Coach:
Muisés Silva

Updated in 2020.

Reserve players

31. Deomentino Madeira (GK)
24. Alexandr Cruz
3. Francisco Locatelli
7. Estevão Soares
2. Mariano Mascarenha
25. Rosário Lopes
22. João Ximenes

Honours
Campeonato Nacional da 1ª Divisão champions: 1967, 1968

Competition records

Liga Futebol Amadora 
2016 Segunda Divisao: 4th place in Group A

Taça 12 de Novembro
2016: 1st Round

References

Football clubs in East Timor
Football
Association football clubs established in 1938
Sport in Dili